Pašman is a village and a municipality in Zadar County, Croatia, located on the eponymous island, which it shares with the municipality of Tkon. According to the 2011 census, the municipality had 2,082 inhabitants, with 392 in Pašman itself.

References

External links
  
Tourist board of the municipality of Pašman 

Populated places in Zadar County
Pašman
Municipalities of Croatia